Amici Park is a park in Little Italy, San Diego, in the U.S. state of California. The park contains multiples Bocce ball courts, a small amphitheater and a large green playing field. The park is used by students of Washington Elementary School.

See also
 List of parks in San Diego

References

External links
 

Parks in San Diego